The Lower Galilee Regional Council (Mo'atza Azorit HaGalil HaTahton) is a regional council in the Northern District of Israel. Lower Galilee Regional Council encompasses most of the settlements in the Lower Galilee with a population of 11,300 (2014), including three kibbutzim, ten moshavim and two community settlements, along with two youth villages located in its administrative territory.

Kadoorie is the seat of Lower Galilee Regional Council and the council building is situated in the proximity to the Kadoorie Agricultural High School. The current Head of Lower Galilee Regional Council is Nitzan Peleg since 2019.

List of settlements
Lower Galilee Regional Council provides municipal services for the populations within its territory, who live in various types of communities including kibbutzim, moshavim, a moshava, community settlements and youth villages:

Kibbutzim
Beit Keshet
Beit Rimon
Lavi

Moshavim

Arbel
HaZor'im
Ilaniya

Kfar Hittim
Kfar Kisch
Kfar Zeitim

Sde Ilan
Shadmot Dvora
Sharona

Moshava
Mitzpa

Community settlements 
Giv'at Avni
Masad
Mitzpe Netofa

Youth villages
Hodayot 
Kadoorie Agricultural High School

Economy

Tourism
During the last decade a big rise has occurred to the guest houses industry in all of the north region of Israel including the Lower Galilee.

Agriculture
The various branches of agriculture are still the most prevalent economic sector in the council region. This includes floral greenhouses, field crops, dairy barns and poultry raising.

Industry
The council also has two industrial areas co-managed with the municipality of Tiberias and the Tur'an local council:
 Lower Galilee Industrial Zone - includes the Wissotzky Tea factory and the Primor juice factory. 
 Lower Galilee Industrial Park

 
Regional councils in Northern District (Israel)